Poitou is a former and historical province of France.

Poitou may also refer to:

Places
County of Poitou, a former and historical county of France
Poitou Marsh, Nouvelle-Aquitaine, France; a marsh
 Gulf of Poitou, that became the Poitou Marsh

Facilities and structures
 Palace of the Counts of Poitou, Poitiers, Poitou, France

People
Seneschal of Poitou, the administrator for the province of Poitou
Count of Poitou, the noble title for the county of Poitou
House of Poitou, a noble house of Aquitaine, France

Persons
 Adelaide of Poitou (952–1004), Queen of the Franks
 Georges Poitou (1926–1989), French mathematician
 Philip of Poitou (died 1208), Bishop of Durham
 Raymond of Poitou (1105–1149), Prince of Antioch
 Roger de Poitou (died 1140), Anglo-Norman aristocrat

Other uses
Escadron de Transport 3/61 Poitou, French aerospace squadron based in Orleans
Poitou donkey (the Poitou;), a French breed of donkey
Poitou goat (the Poitou;), a French breed of goat
Poitou goose (the Poitou;), a French breed of goose; see List of goose breeds
Poitou mule (the Poitou;), a French crossbred mule

See also

 Poitou–Tate duality, in algebraic number fields
 Poitou-Charentes, a former region of France
 Rex du Poitou rabbit, a French breed of rabbit
 
 Poitiers (disambiguation)